Portland Waldorf School is a private Waldorf school in Milwaukie, Oregon, United States, in the former Milwaukie Middle School.

The school has been accredited by the Associated Waldorf Schools of North America since 2002, and by the Northwest Association of Accredited Schools since 2005.

References

External links
 

1982 establishments in Oregon
High schools in Clackamas County, Oregon
Educational institutions established in 1982
Milwaukie, Oregon
Private elementary schools in Oregon
Private high schools in Oregon
Private middle schools in Oregon